Sarah Moussaddak (born April 14, 2000) is a French kickboxer. As of June 2022, she was the #10 ranked women's pound for pound kickboxer in the world by Combat Press.

Kickboxing career
Moussadak made her WFL promotional debut against Samantha Van Doorn at World Fighting League on February 17, 2019. She won the fight by unanimous decision. This victory earned Moussadak a contract with Glory, as she faced Jiwaen Lee at Glory 64: Strasbourg on March 9, 2019, as a late-notice replacement for Esma Hasshass. She won her Glory debut by split decision. Moussadak next faced Aurore Dos Santos at Glory 66: Paris on June 22, 2019. She won the fight by unanimous decision.

Moussadak Christi Brereton at Glory 69: Düsseldorf on October 12, 2019, in her third Glory appearance. She lost the fight by split decision. Moussadak next fought outside of Glory, as she faced Emma Gongora at Nuit Des Champions on November 16, 2019. She once again lost the fight by split decision.

Moussadak returned from a near two-year absence from the sport to face Ella Grapperhouse for the ISKA European -57 kg title, at the October 16, 2021 Fighting Edition event. She captured her first professional title by decision. After capturing the European ISKA title, Moussadak was booked to challenge Anta Marina Sanchez for the WAKO World -56 kg Championship at the May 14, 2022 Fighting Edition event. She won the five-round bout by decision.

Moussadak challenged Tiffany van Soest for the Glory Women's Super Bantamweight Championship at Glory: Collision 4 on October 8, 2022. She lost the fight by a narrow unanimous decision.

Moussadak was expected to face Giuliana Cosnard at  Glory Rivals 5 on January 28, 2023. She later withdrew with an injury and was replaced by Tessa De Kom. Moussadak faced Joana Kiptiu at Fight Night One on April 29, 2023.

Championships and accomplishments
International Sport Karate Association
2021 ISKA European -57 kg Championship
World Association of Kickboxing Organizations
2022 WAKO World -56 kg Championship

Fight record

|- style="background:#;"
| 2023-04-29 || ||align=left| Joana Kiptiu || Fight Night One 14 || Saint-Étienne, France || ||  ||
|-
|-  style="background:#fbb"
| 2022-10-08 || Loss ||align=left| Tiffany van Soest || Glory: Collision 4 || Arnhem, Netherlands || Decision (Unanimous) || 5 || 3:00 
|-
! style=background:white colspan=9 |
|-
|-  style="background:#cfc"
| 2022-05-14 || Win ||align=left| Anta Marina Sanchez || Fighting Edition 4 || Orchies, France || Decision (Unanimous) || 5 || 3:00
|-
! style=background:white colspan=9 |
|-
|-  style="background:#cfc"
| 2021-10-16 || Win ||align=left| Ella Van Grapperhaus || Fighting Edition 3 || Valenciennes, France || Decision || 5 || 3:00
|-
! style=background:white colspan=9 |
|-
|-  style="background:#fbb"
| 2019-11-16 || Loss ||align=left| Emma Gongora || Nuit Des Champions || Marseille, France || Decision (Split) || 3 || 3:00
|-
|-  style="background:#fbb"
| 2019-10-12 || Loss ||align=left| Christi Brereton || Glory 69: Düsseldorf || Düsseldorf, Germany || Decision (Split) || 3 || 3:00
|-
|-  style="background:#cfc"
| 2019-06-22 || Win ||align=left| Aurore Dos Santos || Glory 66: Paris || Paris, France || Decision (Unanimous) || 3 || 3:00
|-
|-  style="background:#cfc"
| 2019-03-09 || Win ||align=left| Jiwaen Lee || Glory 64: Strasbourg || Strasbourg, France || Decision (Split) || 3 || 3:00
|-
|-  style="background:#cfc"
| 2019-02-17 || Win ||align=left| Samantha Van Doorn || World Fighting League || Almere, Netherlands || Decision || 3 || 3:00
|-
|-  style="background:#cfc"
| 2018-12-15 || Win ||align=left| Nguyen Kim Thuy Van || The Fighters 5 || Hérin, France || ||  || 
|-
|-  style="background:#cfc"
| 2018-11-17 || Win ||align=left| Diane Voiturer || Fighting Edition 2 || Orchies, France || Decision || 5 || 3:00
|-
|-  style="background:#cfc"
| 2018-10-06 || Win ||align=left| Soumeya Sammoudi || Challenge || Saint-Amand-les-Eaux , France || TKO (Referee stoppage) || 2 || 
|-
| colspan=9 | Legend:    

|-  style="background:#cfc;"
| 2017-04-30 || Win ||align=left| Jessica Feron || Fight & Dance 5 || Berchem-Sainte-Agathe, France || TKO (Corner stoppage) || 2 || 
|-
|-  style="background:#c5d2ea;"
| 2017-02-19 || Draw ||align=left| Inès Pilutti || Interclub du Napoli Gym || Evere, Belgium || Decision || 3 || 2:00
|-
|-  style="background:#fbb;"
| 2016-03-13 || Loss ||align=left| Giorgina Van Der Linden || l'Emperor Chok Dee || Vandœuvre-lès-Nancy, France || Decision || 3 || 1:30
|-
|-  style="background:#fbb;"
| 2016-01-30 || Loss ||align=left| Chloé Riscala || Go Fight 2 || Marly-le-Roi, France || Decision (Majority) || 3 || 2:00
|-
|-  style="background:#cfc"
| 2015-02-07|| Win ||align=left| Sélia || || Belgium || Decision || 3 || 2:00
|-
|-  style="background:#c5d2ea;"
| 2013-06-02 || No Contest ||align=left| Cynthia Del Sinne || Le Defi Du Nack Muay 4 || Saint-Amand-les-Eaux, France || Decision || 3 || 1:30
|-
! style=background:white colspan=9 |
|-
| colspan=9 | Legend:

See also
 List of female kickboxers

References

1999 births
French female kickboxers
Glory kickboxers
Living people
Sportspeople from Nord (French department)